Christopher Evans or Chris Evans may refer

Entertainment
 Chris Evans (actor) (born 1981), American actor
 Chris Evans (presenter) (born 1966), British broadcaster
 Chris Evans (artist) (born 1967), British artist
 Chris Tally Evans, British artist, director and writer
 Christopher Evans (author) (born 1951), British author of science fiction and children's books
 Christopher Evans (musician) (born 1987), Ugandan vocalist
 Christopher Leith Evans (born 1954), American artist

Politics
 Chris Evans (Australian politician) (born 1958), member of the Australian Senate
 Chris Evans (British politician) (born 1977), British Labour Co-operative politician

Sports
 Chris Evans (American football) (born 1997), American football running back for the Cincinnati Bengals
 Chris Evans (footballer) (born 1962), Welsh footballer and manager
 Chris Evans (ice hockey) (1946–2000), Canadian professional ice hockey player
 Chris Evans (basketball) (born 1991), American pro basketball player

Other
 Chris Evans (journalist) (born 1969), editor of The Daily Telegraph
 Chris Evans (unionist) (1845–1924), British-born American labor unionist
 Christopher Evans (outlaw) (1847–1917), American train robber
 Christopher Evans (theologian) (1909–2012), English chaplain and theologian
 Christopher Evans (computer scientist) (1931–1979), British computer scientist, psychologist and writer on pseudo-science
 Christopher Evans (businessman) (born 1957), British biotech entrepreneur

See also
Christopher Evans-Ironside or Chris Evans, English/German composer and musician